Charlotte Blease is a Northern Irish philosopher of medicine from Belfast, Northern Ireland. She is a healthcare researcher at General Medicine, Beth Israel Deaconess Medical Center, Harvard Medical School, Boston USA. Formerly she was a Fulbright Scholar to the Program in Placebo Studies at Harvard Medical School. She is a former Irish Research Council fellow and a Queen's University, Belfast lecturer.

History 
Blease studied philosophy of science and mind at Queen's University, Belfast. She has held research appointments in the UK, Germany, Ireland, and the USA including at Harvard University in the United States. In 2012 she was a winner of the UK-wide BBC New Generation Thinkers competition for promising young researchers. Blease has written published academic papers on medical ethics, psychotherapy ethics, placebo studies, and the future of the health professions. She specialized in research into placebos as a research fellow after a grant from the Irish Research Council and is a co-founder of the Society for Interdisciplinary Placebo Studies. Blease also held the position of postdoctoral research fellow at the English University of Leeds and worked as a placebo research affiliate at Harvard Medical School. Currently, she is Keane Researcher at OpenNotes, Beth Israel Deaconess Medical Center, USA .

Blease has been an advocate for the teaching of philosophy in schools  in both Northern Ireland and the Republic of Ireland and wrote in the British newspaper The Guardian supporting this.  In 2016 Blease was appointed, alongside Stephen Fry and Lord Neuberger as Patron of SAPERE the UK’s leading educational charity in philosophy for children.

Blease's grandfather was Irish trade unionist Billy Blease.

References 

Living people
British philosophers
Queen's University at Kingston alumni
British scientists
Expatriates from Northern Ireland in the Republic of Ireland
Year of birth missing (living people)